George Griffin (born ) is an English professional rugby league footballer who plays as a  or  for the Castleford Tigers in the Betfred Super League. 

He has previously played for Hull Kingston Rovers, the London Broncos, and the Salford Red Devils in the Super League. He has spent time at Gateshead Thunder in the Championship 1 on dual registration from Hull KR, and at the Wakefield Trinity Wildcats in the Super League on loan from Salford.

Background
Griffin was born in Oxford, Oxfordshire, England. He is the younger brother to Josh and Darrell Griffin.

Griffin previously played rugby union while growing up in Oxford, before moving to rugby league alongside his brothers. He played as a junior for Stanley Rangers.

Career

Hull Kingston Rovers 
Griffin signed for Hull Kingston Rovers on a two-year deal in September 2011. He had been playing in Australia for the Queanbeyan Kangaroos, a feeder team to the Canberra Raiders, and was originally set to sign for Crusaders until they withdrew from Super League.

Griffin made his Super League debut for Hull KR against the Widnes Vikings on 29 July 2012. He went on to make a total of 20 appearances throughout his 2 seasons at Hull KR.

Gateshead Thunder (dual registration) 
In 2013, Griffin played for Gateshead Thunder in the Championship 1 through their dual registration agreement with Hull KR. He made 3 appearances and scored 2 tries for the Thunder.

London Broncos 
In January 2014, it was announced that Griffin had signed for the London Broncos. He made 20 appearances and scored 1 try in the 2014 season.

Salford Red Devils 
In July 2014, shortly after London's relegation from Super League was mathematically confirmed, Griffin signed a one-year deal to join the Salford Red Devils for 2015. He would be joining his older brothers Darrell and Josh who already played for the club.

Griffin played alongside both of his brothers for the first time at the 2015 Magic Weekend against the Widnes Vikings, just days after the death of their father. He signed a two-year contract extension with Salford in June 2015.

In May 2017, Griffin agreed a new two-year contract with Salford, keeping him at the club until the end of 2019.

He played in the 2019 Super League Grand Final defeat to St. Helens at Old Trafford.

Griffin made 115 appearances and scored 20 tries during his time at Salford.

Wakefield Trinity Wildcats (loan) 
Griffin joined the Wakefield Trinity Wildcats on a one-month loan deal in March 2015, making 5 appearances.

Castleford Tigers 
In July 2019, Griffin signed a two-year deal to join the Castleford Tigers (Heritage № 996) from 2020. Head coach Daryl Powell described him as a "tough hard-working player" with a "first-class work rate and attitude".

Griffin was assigned squad number 16 for 2020. He made his Castleford debut on 2 February against the Toronto Wolfpack. He scored his first try for the club against Hull FC in the 6th round of the Challenge Cup.

In May 2021, Griffin extended his contract with the Tigers for a further year. On 17 July 2021, he played for Castleford in their 2021 Challenge Cup Final loss against St Helens.

References

External links

Salford Red Devils profile
Hull Kingston Rovers profile
SL profile

1992 births
Living people
Castleford Tigers players
English rugby league players
Hull Kingston Rovers players
London Broncos players
Newcastle Thunder players
Rugby league locks
Rugby league players from Oxfordshire
Rugby league props
Rugby league second-rows
Salford Red Devils players
Sportspeople from Oxford
Wakefield Trinity players